Brant Lake is a hamlet in the town of Horicon in Warren County, New York, United States. It is located approximately halfway between Albany to the south and Plattsburgh to the north.

History
Since the mid-1880s, Brant Lake has been a popular fishing and hunting area among wealthy visitors, including Theodore Roosevelt. Circa 1900, several hotels began catering to these wealthy visitors. Summer camps for youth were established around the same time. 

Brant Lake Camp] was incorporated by R.B. Gerstenzang, J.E. Eberly, and John F. Malloy in 1917. The camp was featured in  Town & Country magazine. 

Brant Lake Lodge was one of oldest hotels in the area of the Adirondacks; it burned down in April 1925.

Brant Lake has had a post office and postmaster since at least 1892. The seat of government of the Town of Horicon is  located in the hamlet.

Geography
The hamlet is just east of the Adirondack Northway, accessible via interchange 25. NY Route 8 traverses the hamlet. The hamlet is named for the eponymous lake which it surrounds. Brant Lake's ZIP code is 12815. The central part of the hamlet is located to the south of the lake, but ZIP Code 12815 extends to the northern end of the lake and ultimately to the border between Warren and Essex counties. Several summer camps and vacation homes, as well as homes of those who live in the hamlet year-round, line the perimeter of the lake, especially along the eastern and northern shores. The summer camps include Brant Lake Camp, Point O' Pines Camp, Pilgrim Camp, and the Curtis S. Read Scout Reservation.

Gallery

References

Hamlets in Warren County, New York
Hamlets in New York (state)
Adirondacks